The Multispectral Unit for Land Assessment (MULA) is a planned Filipino satellite. Upon completion it will become the largest Filipino-made satellite.

Development
The Philippine Space Agency (PhilSa) announced on June 9, 2021, that a satellite is in development that would be bigger than the ones made previously under the Philippine Scientific Earth Observation Microsatellite (PHL-Microsat) program. The satellite is named Multispectral Unit for Land Assessment (MULA). MULA would be the first of a "next-generation satellites" under the Philippine space program, with the team behind the satellite building on the knowledge gained in developing the Diwata and Maya nanosatellites. The investment cost for the satellite is at least US$34 million.

The satellite project is led by John Leur Labrador and is part of the Advanced Satellite and Know-how Transfer for the Philippines (ASP) of the Department of Science and Technology (DOST). The University of the Philippines Diliman and DOST-Advanced Science and Technology Institute, in coordination of PhilSa, are the lead entities responsible for MULA's development. It is also co-designed with British firm Surrey Satellite Technology. Filipino engineers who worked on MULA were sent to the United Kingdom for an immersion on satellite design and manufacturing process.

The preliminary mission objectives of MULA was determined in early 2020.

Instruments
MULA will weigh , and will become the largest Filipino-made satellite. MULA will also have nine spectral bands for various environmental applications including land cove change maping, crop monitoring, and disaster and forestry management.

It will also be equipped with Automatic Identification System (AIS) and Automatic Dependent Surveillance–Broadcast (ADS–B) which could be used to detect and track aircraft and ships. The satellite will also have a jet propulsion system.

Launch and mission
It was planned that MULA would be launched to space by 2023 but this schedule has been postponed to 2025. MULA will be positioned in low Earth orbit, and will rotate around the globe ten times daily.

References

Earth observation satellites
Satellites of the Philippines
Proposed satellites
STAMINA4Space program
2025 in spaceflight